The 2013/14 FIS Ski Jumping Alpen Cup was the 24th Alpen Cup season in ski jumping for men and the 6th for ladies. It began on 14 August 2013 in Pöhla, Germany and ended on 9 March 2014 in Chaux-Neuve, France.

Other competitive circuits this season included the World Cup, Grand Prix and Continental Cup.

Calendar

Men

Ladies

Overall standings

Men

Ladies

References

2013 in ski jumping
2014 in ski jumping
FIS Ski Jumping Alpen Cup